Brankelow Cottage, also known as Brankelow Folly and Brankelow House, is a folly on the Combermere Abbey estate, in Cheshire, England. It is listed at grade II. Dating from 1797, it was originally a model dairy and later a gamekeeper's cottage with attached kennels. Described by Nikolaus Pevsner and co-authors as a "charming eyecatcher," the folly is ornamented with battlements, pinnacles, pilasters, arrowslits and fancy brickwork.

History
Brankelow Cottage was built in 1797 for Sir Robert Salusbury Cotton (c. 1739–1809). The architect is believed to be John Webb (1754–1828), who has also been suggested to have been the landscape designer used when Cotton landscaped Combermere Park in 1795–97. It was originally a model dairy. The building also contained a sitting room used in summer, whose decorations were done by the Cotton family daughters. It was subsequently used as a gamekeeper's cottage; the pavilions to each end were formerly used as dog kennels. It is now a folly.

Location
It is around 500 metres across the lake from the former abbey, which lies to the east, and 500 metres from the memorial obelisk to Stapleton Cotton, Viscount Combermere. Combermere Park is privately owned and there is no public access.

Description
The building is in red brick with ashlar dressings under a slate roof. It is cross shaped in plan, with both single- and two-storey portions. The main (lake-facing) front has a single storey with seven symmetrical bays, a central three-bay projection to the front, and pavilions to each end. The bays of the main face are separated by pilasters topped with stone finials, and the face is surmounted by a parapet with battlements; there are pinnacles at the corners. The windows to the main face have pointed arches with Tudor-style hood moulds over them. The pavilions have arrowslits and heart-shaped ornaments. Another central three-bay projection stands to the rear, which has two storeys. To each side of the rear projection are extensions dating from the 20th century, which have a circular quadrant plan. The building is further ornamented with fancy brickwork. The interior has a single elliptical room.

Nikolaus Pevsner and co-authors describe the building as a "charming eyecatcher." Historic England describes it as "the main eyecatcher at Combermere."

See also

Listed buildings in Dodcott cum Wilkesley

References

Sources
de Figueiredo P, Treuherz J. Cheshire Country Houses (Phillimore; 1988)
Hartwell C, Hyde M, Hubbard E, Pevsner N. The Buildings of England: Cheshire (2nd edn) (Yale University Press; 2011)

Folly buildings in England
Grade II listed buildings in Cheshire
Houses completed in 1797